Ladislav Miko (born 9 April 1961) is Slovak environmental expert and politician. He was the Minister of Environment in the caretaker government of Jan Fischer but later returned to work for the European Commission. In years 2011-2017 he served as the Deputy Director General of Directorate General for Health and Food Safety (DG SANCO) with responsibilities for the food chain, From January 2018 he was appointed as a Head of EU Representation in Slovakia.

References 

1961 births
Environment ministers of the Czech Republic
Living people
Czech ecologists
Politicians from Košice
Green Party (Czech Republic) Government ministers
Charles University alumni